De Oude Meerdijk is a football stadium in Emmen, Netherlands.  It is the home ground of FC Emmen. It has a capacity of 8,600.

History
De Oude Meerdijk, previously known as Meerdijk Stadion (1977–2001) Univé Stadion (2001–2013) and JENS Vesting (2013-2017), is a multi-use stadium. It is located at the Business Park Meerdijk in Emmen, Netherlands.  It is currently used mostly for football matches and is the home stadium of FC Emmen. The stadium is able to hold 8,600 people and was built in 1977. It was completely renovated in 2001.

In 2005, the stadium was one of the host stadiums for the Football World Youth Championships.

In 2011, the stadium was one of the host stadiums for the 2011 CPISRA Football 7-a-side World Championships.

Gallery

Panorama

References 

FC Emmen
Football venues in the Netherlands
Sports venues in Drenthe
Buildings and structures in Emmen, Netherlands